Roulette at Location One is a live album by multi-instrumentalist Joe McPhee's Trio X featuring bassist Dominic Duval and percussionist Jay Rosen. It was recorded in Brooklyn in 2005 and released on the Cadence Jazz label.

Reception
On All About Jazz, Marc Medwin said "Trio X continues its increasingly longstanding tradition of meditative fire music with this stridently contemplative March 2006 live date. Not so much a series of pieces as a collective meditation on Black music and its history, the album is a palimpsest, bringing together various eras and styles in front of an enthusiastic audience.  ...the disc is another triumph for the group, maybe one of the most interesting and enjoyable statements in its growing catalogue". In JazzTimes, Scott Verrastro wrote "Roulette at Location One exhibits Trio X in peak form, opting for spatial exploration by utilizing remarkable restraint and extraordinary dynamics".

Track listing 
 "Funny Valentines of War" – 15:09
 "Improvs and Melodies of Themes" – 17:24
 "David Danced: Variations on Ellington" – 9:41
 "Sunflower Musings" – 13:21
 "Going Home" – 7:46

Personnel 
Joe McPhee – soprano saxophone, pocket trumpet
Dominic Duval – bass
Jay Rosen – drums

References 

Trio X live albums
2005 live albums
Cadence Jazz Records live albums